Benjamin Chinn Adams (July 16, 1847 - May 1, 1906) was a Mississippi Democratic politician and state senator from 1900 to 1904. He also was the mayor of Grenada, Mississippi, from 1896 to 1898.

Biography 
Benjamin Chinn Adams was born on July 16, 1847, in Carroll County, Mississippi. He was a planter and a lawyer. From May 4, 1896, to May 2, 1898, he was the mayor of Grenada, Mississippi. In 1899, he was elected to represent the 28th District, which comprises Mississippi's Yalobusha and Grenada counties, in the Mississippi State Senate. He died on May 1, 1906, in Grenada, Mississippi.

References 

1847 births
1906 deaths
Democratic Party Mississippi state senators
People from Grenada, Mississippi